Emotional Atyachar is an Indian television series which aired on Bindass. The name and the title song are taken from the film Dev.D.

Emotional Atyachar is a reality show in which a person who doubts his/her boyfriend's/girlfriend's loyalty, can ask for a loyalty test on him/her. The person checking his/her partner's loyalty is referred to as the lead, while the person on whom the loyalty test is being performed is called the suspect. The crew members follow him/her and also ask another boy/girl to act as if he/she is intimate with him/her. These are caught on camera and shown to the lead.

The first season was hosted by Angad Bedi, where as season 2 to 5 were hosted by Pravesh Rana.

Emotional Atyachar was produced by UTV Television with inputs from Creative Director and writer Roshni Ghosh.

A Public Interest Litigation (PIL) was filed, in 2011, by Indraprashtha People, an NGO, through its President Sanjay Tiwari Ujala. He said "through this programme, the TV channel has been hurting the feeling of viewers, spreading vulgarity and demoting social and moral values in our society".

The Law commission, floated a discussion paper, saying "In the recent past, instances of Television channels exceeding the limits of decency by using sting operation (hidden camera) as a tool in ongoing reality shows to expose infidelity of a spouse, boyfriend, etc have been noticed," the commission noted in its discussion paper. "Such sting operations, showing the private life of common men and women, are not conducted for exposing public wrongs and do not serve any public interest or public purpose. They are violating the right to privacy and taking civilisation backward," it added.

References

External links
 Official Website 

Adultery in television
Indian reality television series
Hindi-language television shows
Indian LGBT-related television shows
2009 Indian television series debuts
2015 Indian television series endings
Bindass original programming
UTV Television